Manchester is a census-designated place in northern Chesterfield County, Virginia, United States. The population as of the 2010 Census was 10,804.

Description
Manchester is one of Chesterfield County's 25 designated "communities"; it borders Southside Richmond to the west, but is not to be confused with the city's Manchester neighborhood.

See also

 List of census-designated places in Virginia

References

External links

Census-designated places in Chesterfield County, Virginia
Census-designated places in Virginia